The 1898 election for Mayor of Los Angeles took place on December 5, 1898. Incumbent Meredith P. Snyder was defeated by Frederick Eaton.

Results

References

External links
 Office of the City Clerk, City of Los Angeles

1898
1898 California elections
Los Angeles
1890s in Los Angeles